Micropterix completella is a species of moth belonging to the family Micropterigidae, first described by Otto Staudinger in 1871. It is endemic to Italy and is known only from Sardinia.

References

External links
 lepiforum.de

Micropterigidae
Endemic fauna of Italy
Moths described in 1871
Moths of Europe
Taxa named by Otto Staudinger